Jedara Daasimayya, was an Indian mid-11th century poet and vachanakaara in Kannada. He was born in Mudanuru, a village in Shorapur Taluk, Yadagiri district in Karnataka. Being a weaver by profession,  His village had a Ramanatha temple among its many temples, dedicated to Shiva as worshiped by Rama, the epic hero and incarnation of Vishnu. That is why Dasimayya's signature name (ankitanama) is Ramanatha, meaning Rama's Lord, i.e. Shiva.

Jadara Dasimayya's vachanas are dedicated to Ramanatha. He was one of the earliest propagator of Hinduism in India. He was a staunch worshipper of Shiva.

According to the legend, Dasimayya was performing intense ascetic practices in a jungle, when he claimed Shiva appeared to him. He allegedly told him to work in the practical world. As a result, Dasimayya renounced his practices and took up the trade of a weaver. He is also known as Jedar Dasimayya, "Dasimayya of the weavers". Today there is a large community of weavers called Devanga spread across the southern states of India who follow Jadara Dasimayya.

Today, popular tradition identifies several places where Dasimayya set up his weaver's looms in Mudanuru.

Like most  that followed him, he taught a life of complete nonviolence, even teaching local hunting tribes to renounce meat and provide for themselves through pressing and selling oil.

Dasimayya married Duggale, who grew up in Shivapura. He later became a teacher, eventually giving initiation to the wife of the local Chalukya king Jayasimha, Suggale.

A street in Bengaluru has been renamed after this great poet. 
After much opposition from Indian National Congress, on 12th Octobe 2022 - Jumma Masjid Street in the heart of Bengaluru has been renamed to "Sree Devara Dasimayya Road".

References

Kannada poets
Indian male poets
10th-century Indian poets